James Oliver Buswell, Jr. (January 16, 1895 – February 4, 1977) was a Presbyterian theologian, educator and institution builder.

Education
Buswell was born in Burlington, Wisconsin. He received an A.B. from the University of Minnesota (1917), a B.D. from McCormick Theological Seminary (1923), an M.A. from the University of Chicago, and his Ph.D. from New York University (1949).

Professional life
He served as a chaplain in the 140th Infantry during World War I. After pastorates in a Presbyterian church in Milwaukee (1919–1922) and a Reformed church in Brooklyn (1922–26), Buswell became president of Wheaton College from 1926 to 1940. He then served as president of the National Bible Institute of New York City, and its successor, Shelton College, in Ringwood, New Jersey from 1941 to 1955. And finally, in 1956, he became dean of Covenant College (1956–1964) and Covenant Theological Seminary (1956–1970) in St. Louis, Missouri. The libraries at both Wheaton College and Covenant Theological Seminary bear his name.

Tenure as President of Wheaton College
In January 1926, the young Rev. Buswell was on the campus of Wheaton College to deliver a week's worth of chapel sermons. Within weeks, college trustees invited Buswell to become Wheaton's third president (and first ever not named Blanchard). He was the youngest college president at 31 years old. Over the next 14 years, Buswell oversaw a significant period of growth in both numbers and academic rigor. He guided the college through the process of accreditation, bolstered its curriculum (especially in the sciences), increased the percentage of full-time faculty with Ph.D.'s from 24% to 49%, and saw the enrollment grow from 400 to 1,100.  However, Buswell's staunch Calvinism, fundamentalist separatism and his reportedly difficult temperament made his tenure at Wheaton an uneasy one. After years of contentious relations on campus, the Wheaton board of trustees fired Buswell.

Doctrinal Distinctives

Although not a dispensationalist, he was a premillennialist who believed in what pre-tribulationists call a "mid-tribulation rapture."  (Actually, he believed that the Bible term tribulation only applies to the 2nd half of Daniel's 70th week; thus a so-called "mid-tribulationist" may well call himself a "pre-tribulationist.")  He authored dozens of articles and eleven books, most notably, A Systematic Theology of the Christian Religion, 2 vols. (1962–63, out-of-print). Peculiar beliefs of Buswell include his theory that Melchizedek was a pre-incarnate appearance of Christ and that God's omnipresence does not mean that His existence extends throughout the universe—one may think of the universe as in God's lap.

Fundamentalist Churchman
Buswell was a staunch Calvinist who held to the Westminster Standards and covenant theology. He was considered a fundamentalist given his firm stand against the modernist accommodation within mainline Protestant denominations and his insistence on holding to the historic fundamentals (basics) of Christian doctrine.

In 1936, he was dismissed from the ministry of the Presbyterian Church in the U.S.A. for the part that he played in the Independent Mission Board controversy, and became a figure in the founding of what would become the Orthodox Presbyterian Church. The following year, he joined another fundamentalist Carl McIntire in forming the Bible Presbyterian Church. He would later participate in the Evangelical Presbyterian Church (formerly the Bible Presbyterian Church, Columbus Synod) and the Reformed Presbyterian Church, Evangelical Synod.

Personal life

Buswell married Helen (née Spaulding) in 1918 and together they had four children, Jane, James III, Ruth, and John.  His grandson and namesake was the virtuoso violinist, James O. Buswell IV (Dec. 4, 1946 - Sept. 28, 2021).

Works

Thesis

Books

—originally published in 2 volumes

Works by children of J. Oliver Buswell, Jr.
Buswell, James Oliver III [12 January 1922 - 8 August 2011]

References

External links
Buswell and Machen in Fundamentalist Controversy
J. Oliver Buswell, Jr. Papers, PCA Historical Center, St. Louis, MO
The J. Oliver Buswell, Jr. Library, Covenant Theological Seminary
Buswell Memorial Library, Wheaton College

1895 births
1977 deaths
Military personnel from Wisconsin
People from Burlington, Wisconsin
United States Army personnel of World War I
Orthodox Presbyterian Church ministers
Presbyterian Church in the United States of America ministers
Christian fundamentalists
Heads of universities and colleges in the United States
20th-century Calvinist and Reformed theologians
University of Minnesota alumni
McCormick Theological Seminary alumni
University of Chicago alumni
New York University alumni
20th-century American clergy
20th-century American academics